The Arakwal are an Aboriginal Australian people of the state of New South Wales.

Country
Their inland extension ran as far as Lismore, Casino and Coraki. Their boundaries at Ballina joined those of the Widje hordes of the Badjelang.

Alternative names
 Coo-al
 Jawjumjeri
 Kahwul
 Kogung
 Lismore tribe
 Naiang
 Njung
 Nyung
 Yawkum-yore.

Source:

Notes

Citations

Sources

Aboriginal peoples of New South Wales